5.0 is the sixth studio album by American rapper Nelly. It was released through Universal Motown Records (Universal Music Group) and Derrty (Universal Music Group) on November 12, 2010. The album features guest appearances from Kelly Rowland, Keri Hilson, DJ Khaled, Baby, Sophie Greene, Ali, Plies, Chris Brown, T.I., Yo Gotti, T-Pain, Akon, Talib Kweli, Avery Storm, Murphy Lee, Dirty Money and Sean Paul while production was handled by Infamous, Dr. Luke, Mr. Bangladesh, Jim Jonsin, Multiman, Polow da Don, Rico Love and The Runners, among others. 5.0 is predominately a hip hop and pop music album with subtle influences of R&B.

The album debuted at #10 on the US Billboard 200, selling over 65,000 copies in its 1st week in the United States. The album's 1st single "Just a Dream" which became the 1st song from 5.0 to garner UK and US airplay which impacted  charts around the world. Released on August 17, 2010, it is Nelly's most successful single in 5 years (since "Grillz"), peaking at #3 in the United States.

Background 
On July 8, 2009, Nelly made a public announcement in Las Vegas that he was recording a new album. He would tell DJ Semtex that he was planning to release a self-titled album in the first quarter of 2010. In an interview with MTV's Shaheem Reid, the rapper said he was fuelled by the lukewarm reception of his previous albums to produce something better.
As an artist, you want to wake up every day and feel like you're doing something people don't think you can do. Now I feel like I've been put in that position again, where it's more doubt than expectancy. The doubt is what fuels me, so to speak. I've been real fortunate where I have great people around me. Everybody wants to freakin' work with me – not that everybody didn't [before], but it's different because I didn't work with a lot of people. Coming into this situation, it's beautiful.

The rapper T.I. features in a track on the album ("She So Fly"), produced by 1500 or Nothin' of The Smash Factory, according to a video in the studio. Hoping to recreate the success of their 2002 Billboard chart-topping single "Dilemma", Nelly has also worked with Kelly Rowland for the sequel ("Gone"), produced by Jim Jonsin and Rico Love. He has collaborated with actress/singer Taraji P. Henson on a Jermaine Dupri-produced song, however it was confirmed later that Taraji was unable to perform on the record.

Title 
On June 3, 2010, Nelly announced that the album would be titled Nelly 5.0. The title was inspired by his 2011 Ford Mustang, which is also on the album artwork. He said:
It's a lot of things. It's also my fifth drop date. It's just the energy of it all. The Mustang [5.0] was always one of my dream cars. As soon as I had enough money to buy one of these mothaf–, they stopped making these shits. It was just like, "Ahhh!" You know in Menace II Society when he jacked that ride? And then they came back… That was like the ultimate scene. I always wanted one of them mothaf–, money green. But when I got a chance, they stopped making them. I had this meeting with Ford where they asked me these random questions about cars and I just got to talking it up. I was like, "Why ya'll ain't brought back the 5.0 Mustang? That shit was hot!

Singles 
The album's lead single "Just a Dream", was released August 16, 2010 to iTunes Stores around the world for digital download. It was released to Mainstream and Rhythm/Crossover radio on August 10, 2010. "Just a Dream" made its first chart appearance debuting on the US Billboard Hot 100 at number 12 and peaking at number 3 in its eighth week. The song also debuted at number 8 on the Billboard Digital Songs chart, selling 135,000 downloads in its first week. "Just a Dream" is Nelly's highest-charting song since his 2005 single "Grillz" and debuted at number 22 on the Billboard Rap Songs. The song entered the Canadian Hot 100 in August 2010, at number 32. It debuted in Australia (ARIA Charts) on the Singles Chart at number 24, in New Zealand Singles Charts at number 29, and in Switzerland (Media Control AG) at number 52. The Sanji-directed music video premiered on Vevo on September 24, 2010.

The album's second single "Move That Body"; produced by Dr. Luke, along with Mr. Bangladesh and featuring guest appearances from Akon and T-Pain. The song was released for digital download on October 12, 2010. The song made its first chart appearance debuting on the US Billboard Hot 100 at number 54 and has reached a current peak at number 29 in Australia. The music video for the single was directed by Marc Klasfeld.

The album's third single, titled "Gone" featuring guest appearance from singer Kelly Rowland. It was sent to urban and Urban AC stations on January 4, 2011. It will be sent to Top 40/Mainstream radio on January 18, 2011. On January 6, 2011, Nelly said on his Twitter, "new Nelly single... "Gone" featuring Kelly Rowland video coming very soon #5.0 :-)", the song is set to be released as the third official single from the album. The video for "Gone" was finally debuted to the public on March 12, 2011. In the United States, "Gone" peaked at a lowly number 59 on the Billboard Hot R&B/Hip-Hop Songs chart, but has so far fared better in international markets where it has so far charted in Australia and the UK.

Other songs
The Dutch-produced "Tippin' in da Club" was released as the album's promotional single on August 17, 2010. It is not included on the final track listing. The album's second promotional single "Long Gone" featuring Plies and Chris Brown, was released on November 9, 2010. In November 2010, the song "Liv Tonight" featuring Keri Hilson, which debuted at number 58 on the UK Singles Chart, number 74 on the Canadian Hot 100, and number 75 on the US Billboard Hot 100, without release as a single. On the week of June 12, 2011, the song returned to the UK Singles Chart at number 72. A week later, it made a new peak of number 52.

Critical reception 

Upon its release, 5.0 received generally mixed reviews from most music critics. At Metacritic, which assigns a normalized rating out of 100 to reviews from mainstream critics, the album received an average score of 52, based on nine reviews, which indicates "mixed or average reviews". 

Simon Vozick-Levinson of Entertainment Weekly gave 5.0 a B rating and commented that "on 5.0 Nelly makes a reasonably convincing case that he can keep the momentum going. His lyrics are vacuous as ever, but those hooks sure are sticky." 

Mariel Concepcion from Billboard said that on "5.0, the rapper proves he still knows what it takes to make a solid, well-rounded album." Concepcion concluded her review by saying that "The 36-year-old artist gives fans the stuff they fell in love with 10 years ago on debut Country Grammar — and with a new pop-driven sound, he demonstrates he hasn't lost a beat." 

Ken Capobianco from The Boston Globe said that "Nelly has recruited an all-star supporting cast and emerged with a tuneful mainstream effort that should yield a number of hits." Capobianco said that "Just a Dream" "captures the design of many of these cuts: Hooks are prominent while Nelly's patented tricky flow is often smoothed out." He also praised songs like "Move That Body", "Don't It Feel Good" and "1000 Stacks".

Chuck Eddy from Rolling Stone gave the album two and a half stars (out of five). He said that Nelly "essays a few fashionably global-sounding electro-club tracks, [...] and at least four numbers where he swipes guys' girlfriends. Keri Hilson and Kelly Rowland help him stretch out; Plies, Yo Gotti and T.I. add muscle." Eddy said that the "strut swings most distinctively in "1000 Stacks", where a Biggie sample inspires Nelly to approximate the country grammar he came up on." 

Jesse Cataldo from Slant Magazine gave the album a rating of two stars (out of five). Cataldo said that 5.0 is "never overtly awful, but it definitely sinks into the zone of mediocrity occupied by so many mainstream rap albums, where they sit like dishes moldering beneath dirty water." Cataldo said that Nelly has lost his "charm and playfulness he began with" on the albums following Country Grammar. He felt that what is left is "a murky stew of withered affections and grasps at modernity, from siren effects to processed horns and Auto-Tune breakdowns." Cataldo said that the album contains "A collection of collaborations with low-wattage names and also-rans, it basically indicates that even if Nelly is still trying (which he doesn't seem to be), he hasn't sustained the credibility to achieve a plausible comeback." 

Andy Kellman from Allmusic also gave the album two stars (out of five). Kellman said that "nothing on the rapper’s sixth studio album encourages repeated listening". He felt that "Nelly’s exuberance often sounds feigned", the "rallying choruses are not effective, and he’s short on ideas". Kellman concluded his review by saying that 5.0 is "by a considerable margin, Nelly’s least essential release to date".

Commercial performance 
5.0 debuted at number 10 on the Billboard 200, selling 63,000 copies in its first week in the United States. It also entered at number 1 on the Billboards Top Rap Albums and number 2 on the Top R&B/Hip-Hop Albums. The album debuted the same week on the Canadian Albums Chart at number 19. As of August 2013, the album has sold 314,000 copies in the United States.

 Track listing Notes Track listing and credits from album booklet.
 (*) signifies a co-producer
 "Making Movies" and "Don't It Feel Good" features uncredited vocals by Rico Love.Sample credits "Long Gone" contains a sample of "Let's Start Love Over", written by Micheal Claxton and performed by Miles Jaye.
 "1000 Stacks" contains a sample of "Everyday Struggle", written by Christopher Wallace, Dave Grusin, Harvey Mason, Norman Glover, Reginald Ellis, embodies portions of "Kick in the Door", written by Christopher Wallace, Christopher Martin and Jalacy Hawkins, both performed by The Notorious B.I.G. and uncredited vocals by Diddy.
 "k.I.s.s" contains portions of "Kissing You", written by Julian Jackson, Brion James, Janice Johnson and Charles Wiggins.

 Personnel 
Adapted from Allmusic and album booklet.[ Credits: 5.0]. Allmusic. Retrieved on November 16, 2010.Creativity and management Cornell Haynes, Jr. (Nelly) – executive producer
 Marc Baptiste – photographer
 Blu Bolden  – A&R
 Sandy Brummels – art direction
 Ashaki Meyers – stylist

 Ed Richardson – A&R Universal Motown
 Irene Richter – project co-ordination
 Seannita Parmer – stylist
 Megan Dennis – project co-ordination
 Christopher Kornmann – art directionPerformers Nelly – vocals, songwriting
 Rico Love – background vocals 
 Baby – guest vocal performance 
 DJ Khaled – guest vocal performance 
 Plies – guest vocal performance 
 Chris Brown – guest vocal performance 
 T.I. – guest vocal performance 
 T-Pain – guest vocal performance 
 Akon – guest vocal performance 
 Diddy – background vocals 

 Kelly Rowland – guest vocal performance 
 Yo Gotti – guest vocal performance 
 Sophie Greene – guest vocal performance 
 Keri Hilson – guest vocal performance 
 Talib Kweli – guest vocal performance 
 Ali – guest vocal performance 
 Avery Storm – guest vocal performance 
 Dirty Money – guest vocal performance 
 Murphy Lee – guest vocal performance 
 Sean Paul – guest vocal performance Technical'''

 Marco Rodriguez-Diaz (Infamous) – bass, drums, guitar, percussion, producer, programming
 Polow da Don – producer, programming
 Carl Nappa – engineer, audio mixer
 Jeremy Stevenson – recording engineer
 Joshua Mosser – audio mixer, recording engineer
 The Smash Factory – producer, programming
 Elliot Carter – recording engineer
 James Scheffer (Jim Jonsin) – keyboards, producer, programming
 Richard Butler, Jr. (Rico Love) – producer, programming, vocal producer
 Robert Marks – recording engineer, audio mixer
 Ryan Evans – recording engineer
 Jason Wilkie – recording assistant, mixing assistant
 Matt Huber – recording assistant, mixing assistant
 Chad Jolley – mixing assistant
 Frank Romano – guitar
 Thurston McCrea – recording assistant, additional engineering
 Brandon Jones – additional engineering
 Eric Goudy II (E) – keyboards, programming
 Earl Hood – programming, keyboards, producer
 Serban Ghenea – audio mixer
 Lukasz Gottwald (Dr. Luke) – instrumentation, producer, programming
 Shondrae Crawford (Mr. Bangladesh) – producer, composer, instrumentation, programming
 Venza Gottwald – assistant

 Brian Gardner – mastering engineer
 Emily Wright – engineer
 Chris "Tek" O'Ryan – engineer, vocal producer
 John Hanes – audio mixer
 Tim Roberts – assistant audio mixer
 Don Vito – producer, programming
 Blade– producer, recording engineer, programming
 Fabian Marasciullo – audio mixer
 Fareed Salamah – assistant
 Jermaine Jackson and Andrew Harr (The Runners) – instrumentation, producer, programming
 Jeff Villanueva (Supa Jeff) – engineer
 Danny Morris – keyboards, producer, programming
 Jim Bottari – engineer
 Diego Avendano – assistant
 Keith Ross – vocal producer
 Kim Elsberg (Multiman) – instrumentation, producer, engineer, programming
 Uriel Kadouc (Frenchie) – programming, producer
 Trife Trizzil – producer, percussion, drums, programming, engineer
 Jason Derouchie – mixing assistant
 Uncle Rudy Haynes – keyboards
 Laurent Cohen – recording engineer, producer, programming, keyboards
 Chris Gehringer – mastering engineer

Charts

Weekly charts

Year-end charts

 Release history 

 References 

 External links 
 5.0'' at Metacritic

2010 albums
Nelly albums
Albums produced by Bangladesh (record producer)
Albums produced by Dr. Luke
Albums produced by Jim Jonsin
Albums produced by Polow da Don
Albums produced by Rico Love
Albums produced by 1500 or Nothin'